The Chicago, Milwaukee and St. Paul Railway Passenger Depot is located in Beaver Dam, Wisconsin.

History
The building is a red brick cottage-like depot of the Chicago, Milwaukee, St. Paul and Pacific Railroad designed by Frost & Granger and built in 1900. It later served as the Dodge County Historical Museum before being restored to house the Beaver Dam Chamber of Commerce.

It was listed on the National Register of Historic Places in 1981 and on the State Register of Historic Places in 1989.

References

Railway stations on the National Register of Historic Places in Wisconsin
National Register of Historic Places in Dodge County, Wisconsin
Beaver Dam
Former railway stations in Wisconsin
Charles Sumner Frost buildings
Victorian architecture in Wisconsin
Brick buildings and structures
Railway stations in the United States opened in 1900